The European qualification for the 2015 World Women's Handball Championship, in Denmark was played over two rounds. The 2015 hosts Denmark were qualified automatically for the World Championship.

In the first round of qualification, 14 teams who were not participating at the 2014 European Championship were split into four groups. The group winners and the remaining 14 teams from the European Championship played a playoff afterwards to determine the other nine qualifiers.

Qualification phase 1

Seedings
The draw was made on 22 July at 11:00. The group winners advanced to the playoff round.

Group 1
The mini-tournament was hosted in Switzerland.

Group 2
The mini-tournament was hosted in Austria.

Group 3
The teams opted to play the group in a home and away series.

Group 4
The mini-tournament was hosted in the Czech Republic.

Qualification phase 2
The teams played a home-and away series to determine the final tournament participants. The draw was made on 21 December 2014.

Seedings

Matches

First leg

Second leg

Hungary won 74–44 on aggregate.

France won 54–41 on aggregate.

Russia won 49–46 on aggregate.

Romania won 56–54 on aggregate.

Netherlands won 56–48 on aggregate.

Spain won 45–39 on aggregate.

Montenegro won 47–38 on aggregate.

Poland won 54–40 on aggregate.

Sweden won 51–44 on aggregate.

References

External links
Eurohandball.com 

2014 in handball
2015 in handball
World Handball Championship tournaments
Qualification for handball competitions